Sulzfeld am Main is a municipality  in the district of Kitzingen in Bavaria in Germany.

Mayor
1984–2020: Gerhard Schenkel (born 1955), he was reelected in 1990, 1996, 2002, 2008 and 2014.
since 2020: Matthias Dusel (born 1968)

References

Kitzingen (district)